King's Bounty: Crossworlds is an expansion pack for the tactical role-playing game King's Bounty: Armored Princess.

It includes the Orcs on the March expansion (which is the expanded version of Armored Princess campaign, totally rebalanced with orcs), two new independent campaigns, and an editor with help system. The editor allows the user to create additional content for the game and alter it in any way.

Development
The development of the expansion pack was revealed on 24 May 2010 by 1C Company and Katauri Interactive. New additions that were announced in the expansion pack included two new campaigns Champion of the Arena and Defender of the Crown, Orcs on the March expansion for King's Bounty: Armored Princess, new quests, items, spells and creatures. A game-editor was also announced allowing players to create mods for King's Bounty' Armored Princess with the help of the tool. The game was released on September 17, 2010, and was released in three different editions. The standard version contains the new content of King’s Bounty: Crossworlds and requires an installed version of King's Bounty: Armored Princess. The Game of the Year Edition contained both King's Bounty: Armored Princess as well as King’s Bounty: Crossworlds. King's Bounty: Platinum Edition contains King's Bounty' Armored Princess and King’s Bounty: Crossworlds along with King's Bounty: The Legend.

Reception

The game holds a score of 78/100 on Metacritic and an aggregate of 75.7% on GameRankings. King's Bounty: Crossworlds received an 8/10 from Brett Todd of GameSpot, who said that the "combat is still no walk in the park", and that although the game "feels awfully familiar, it is also the best version of the strategy role-playing hybrid yet released." Mike Splechta of GameZone awarded it a score of 7/10. Jazz McDougall of PC Gamer gave it a score of 78/100, calling its campaigns less interesting than the King's Bounty: Armored Princess.

References

External links
King's Bounty: Crossworlds at 1C Company official website

2010 video games
1C Company games
Fantasy video games
Tactical role-playing video games
Video game expansion packs
Video game sequels
Video games developed in Russia
Windows games
Windows-only games